Le passé simple may refer to:
Passé simple, a past tense in French
The Simple Past, a novel